William Mercer (8 November 1874 – 9 September 1932) was a Scottish football outside left who played in the Scottish League for Cowdenbeath and Hibernian. He also played in the Football League for Glossop. After his retirement as a player, Mercer served Cowdenbeath as trainer and was secretary of junior club Vulcan Rovers.

Personal life 
Mercer worked as a miner and died after coming off his shift at Donibristle Colliery in 1932.

Career statistics

Honours 

Cowdenbeath Hall of Fame

References 

Scottish footballers
Cowdenbeath F.C. players
Scottish Football League players
1874 births
1932 deaths
Scottish miners
Association football outside forwards
People from Cowdenbeath
Glossop North End A.F.C. players
Hibernian F.C. players
English Football League players
Cowdenbeath F.C. non-playing staff